Władysław Szajnocha (1857-1928) was a Polish geologist and paleontologist; son of historian Karol Szajnocha. Rector of the Jagiellonian University (1911-1912 and 1916-1917).

References

1857 births
1928 deaths
20th-century Polish geologists
Polish paleontologists
Rectors of the Jagiellonian University
19th-century Polish geologists